Stanton Davis, Jr. (born November 10, 1945, New Orleans) is an American jazz trumpeter and educator.

Davis studied at the Berklee College of Music (1967–69) and the New England Conservatory (1969–73), and served as program director for MIT's radio station from 1968-74. He received his master's in ethnomusicology from Wesleyan University in 1983. He initially played locally in the Boston area, and then with George Russell, Mercer Ellington, Lester Bowie, Charlie Haden, George Gruntz, Jim Pepper, Bob Stewart, Muhal Richard Abrams, Sam Rivers, Gil Evans, Webster Lewis, Jaki Byard, Max Roach, and James Moody. He has taught at Southeast Massachusetts University (1976–78), Wellesley College (1981–84), Bennington College (1980–82), and the New England Conservatory of Music (1980–82), and also worked with the Jazzmobile (1980–88).

Davis's only major release as a bandleader is 1988's Manhattan Melody, released on Enja Records. There was an earlier LP from his Boston period  called Brighter Days released in 1977 on Outrageous Records by his group named "Stanton Davis' Ghetto/Mysticism".

Discography
As leader
Brighter Days (Outrageous Records Incorporated, 1977) 
Manhattan Melodies (Enja, 1988)
With Muhal Richard Abrams
View from Within (Soul Note, 1984)
With Ray Anderson
It Just So Happens (Enja, 1987)
With Lester Bowie
I Only Have Eyes for You (ECM, 1985)
Avant Pop (ECM, 1986)
Twilight Dreams (Venture, 1987)
Serious Fun (DIW, 1989)
My Way (DIW, 1990)
Live at the 6th Tokyo Music Joy (DIW, 1991)
With George Gruntz
First Prize (Enja, 1989)
With Charlie Haden
The Montreal Tapes: Liberation Music Orchestra (Verve, 1989 [1999])
With Jimmy McGriff
You Ought to Think About Me (Headfirst, 1990)
With George Russell
The Essence of George Russell (Sonet, 1969)
Trip to Prillarguri (Soul Note, 1970)
Listen to the Silence (Soul Note, 1971)
Living Time (Columbia, 1974) with Bill Evans
New York Big Band (Soul Note, 1978)
Live in an American Time Spiral (Soul Note, 1982)
The 80th Birthday Concert (Concept, 2003)
With Bob Stewart
First Line (JMT, 1988)

References
Leonard Feather and Ira Gitler, The Biographical Encyclopedia of Music. Oxford, 1999, pp. 170–171.

American jazz trumpeters
American male trumpeters
Wesleyan University alumni
Living people
21st-century trumpeters
1945 births
Jazz musicians from Louisiana
21st-century American male musicians
American male jazz musicians